This is a list of hotels in Los Angeles (including the Greater Los Angeles Area).

Hotels in Los Angeles 

 Alan Hotel
 Ambassador Hotel
 Andaz West Hollywood
 The Beverly Hills Hotel
 The Beverly Hilton
 Beverly Wilshire Hotel
 Boyle Hotel – Cummings Block
 Cecil Hotel
 Century Plaza Hotel
 Chateau Marmont
 Crowne Plaza: Los Angeles-Commerce Casino
 Culver Hotel
 DoubleTree by Hilton Hotel Los Angeles Downtown
 Downtown Standard Hotel
 Dunbar Hotel
 Fremont Hotel, Los Angeles
 Glen-Holly Hotel
 Hollywood Hotel
 Hollywood Melrose Hotel
 Hollywood Roosevelt Hotel
 Hotel Alexandria
 Hotel Bel-Air
 Hotel Chancellor
 Hotel Indigo: Los Angeles Downtown
 InterContinental: Los Angeles Downtown
 Los Angeles Marriott
 Knickerbocker Hotel
 L'Ermitage Beverly Hills
 Millennium Biltmore Hotel
 Mondrian Los Angeles
 Monte Vista Hotel
 Park Plaza Hotel
 The Peninsula Beverly Hills
 Pico House
 Regency Plaza Suites
 Sheraton Town House/Sheraton West
 Sportsmen's Lodge
 Sunset Marquis Hotel
 Sunset Tower
 Superior Oil Company Building
 Vibe Hotel
 Westin Bonaventure Hotel
 Wilshire Grand Center

See also
 Lists of hotels – hotel list articles on Wikipedia

References

External links

 
Hotels
Los Angeles
Los Angeles
Hotels in Los Angeles